Veppampattu railway station is one of the railway stations of the Chennai Central–Arakkonam section of the Chennai Suburban Railway Network. It serves the neighbourhood of Veppampattu, a suburb of Chennai located 32 km west of Chennai Central. It has an elevation of 39 m above sea level. Veppampattu is one of the fastest developing suburban areas in Chennai.

History
The first lines in the station were electrified on 29 November 1979, with the electrification of the Chennai Central–Tiruvallur section.

See also

 Chennai Suburban Railway

References

External links
 Veppampattu station at Indiarailinfo.com

Stations of Chennai Suburban Railway
Railway stations in Tiruvallur district